The 2011–12 season in Primera División de Nicaragua will be divided into two tournaments (Apertura and Clausura) and will determine the 59th and 60th champions in the history of the league. It will also provide the sole berth for the 2012–13 CONCACAF Champions League. The Apertura tournament will be played in the second half of 2011, while the Clausura will be played in the first half of 2012.

Promotion and Relegation
Promoted from Segunda División de Fútbol Nicaragua.
 Champions: Juventus
 Winner of promotion/relegation playoff: Chinandega FC

Relegated to Segunda División de Fútbol Nicaragua.
 Last place: América Managua (although they didn't finish last they had to replay a game, which the team refused to play and forfeited the match meaning they were relegated).
 Loser of promotion/relegation playoff: Xilotepelt

Team information
Last updated: July 7, 2011

Stadia and locations

Personnel and sponsoring (2011 Apertura)

Managerial Changes

Before the start of the season

During the regular season

Apertura
The 2011 Apertura was the first tournament of the season. It began on 6 August 2011.

Regular season
The regular season began on 6 August 2011. The top four finishers will move on to the next stage of the competition.

Standings

Results

Positions by round

Finals round
The top two finishers in the Semi-finals Group will move on to the final.

Semi-finals Group

Final

First leg

Second leg

Clausura
The 2012 Clausura was the second tournament of the season.

Personnel and sponsoring (2011 Apertura)

Managerial Changes

Before the start of the season

During the regular season

Regular season
The top four finishers will move on to the next stage of the competition.

Standings

Results

Positions by round

Finals round
The top two finishers in the Semi-finals Group will move on to the final.

Semi-finals Group

Final

First leg

Second leg

Real Esteli won 6-1 on aggregate.

Aggregate table

List of foreign players in the league
This is a list of foreign players in Clausura 2012. The following players:
have played at least one apertura game for the respective club.
have not been capped for the Nicaragua national football team on any level, independently from the birthplace

A new rule was introduced a few season ago, that clubs can only have four foreign players per club and can only add a new player if a player/s is released.

Chinandega
  Roberto Chanampe
  Jonathan Brigatti
  Christian Rodriguez
  Jaime Crisanto

Diriangén FC
  Johnni Saavedra
  Christian Mena
  Herberth Cabrera
  Victor Castillo

Juventus Managua
  Victor Carrasco
  Jorge Hernandez

Managua
  Andres Giraldo
  Jose Flores
  Christian Batiz
  Juan Tablada

 (player released mid season)

Ocotal
  Luis Maradiaga
  Marcos Rivera
  Byron Maradiaga
  Erick Sierra

Real Esteli
  Elmer Mejia
  Manuel Rosas
  Fernando Alvez
  Luiz Gonzales

Real Madriz
  Ramon Pedrozo
  Victor Norales
  Rony Colon
  Julio Pastor Ruiz

Walter Ferretti
  Mario Gracia
  Jose Fernando Parra
  Yaidero Alberio
  Darwig Ramirez

External links
http://www.futbolnica.net/
http://www.soccerway.com/national/nicaragua/1a-division/2011-2012/apertura/
http://www.lusaco.tk/

Nicaraguan Primera División seasons
1
Nicaragua